Levadiakos Football Club is a Greek professional football club that plays in the Super League Greece. Based in Livadeia, Greece, the club was  promoted to the Alpha Ethniki, forerunner of the Super League, after ten seasons in minor divisions in the 2005–06 season, as runner-up of the Football League in 2004–05. It was then relegated to the Beta Ethniki again in 2006–07 and returned to the top tier in 2007–08.  The club finished one level above relegation that year but was relegated back to the second division by finishing 14th in 2009–10. The club most recently won promotion back into the Super League Greece after winning the Super League Greece 2 in 2021–22.

History

Levadiakos started in 1961, when local clubs Trofonios and Pallevadiaki merged into a greater club. Straight after, Levadiakos played in the second division being close to relegation in almost every season. In the 1980s, the team was upgraded and in May 1987, players and supporters of the club celebrated the team's first ever promotion to Alpha Ethniki following a career great season by Konstantinos "Prince" Litinas. Levadiakos stayed there only for four seasons, returning again only in 1994 and 1995. After their second relegation, Levadiakos declined and went very lower, even struggling to clinch promotion to the 3rd division of Greece. But once more, everything changed suddenly and the team reached again the Greek Super League after ten years, in 2005, but was immediately relegated. In the next summer, Levadiakos bought many expensive players and appointed Georgi Vasilev as manager. Vasiliev achieved to get the team to the Super League once again, and in the 2007–08 season he struggled, but managed to avoid going down again. Nevertheless, he resigned from the club and he was succeeded by Momčilo Vukotić.

Crest and colours
The club's crest has blue and green vertical stripes inspired by the great Konstantinos "Prince" Litinas. It comes from the colours of Pallevadiaki (green) and Trofonio (blue), the clubs that joined in order to establish Levadiakos. The colour common to both teams was white, which was also the basic colour of the group in the early years of its foundation.

Stadium
Levadiakos' stadium was built in 1952. The stadium is located in Livadeia, about 130 km north-west of Athens. The stadium itself is located on the south side of Livadeia.

Seasons in the 21st century 

Best position in bold.

Key: 1R = First Round, 2R = Second Round, 3R = Third Round, 4R = Fourth Round, 5R = Fifth Round, GS = Group Stage, QF = Quarter-finals, SF = Semi-finals.

Players

Current squad

Out on loan

Retired Numbers
10 – Ιn honor of Giannis Kompotis, the owner of the club

Former managers

 Takis Lemonis (July 1, 2005 – June 30, 2006)
 Sakis Tsiolis (2006–07)
 Georgi Vasilev (July 1, 2007 – March 3, 2008)
 Momčilo Vukotić (July 1, 2008 – Sept 23, 2009)
  Quique Hernández (Sept 25, 2009 – March 1, 2010)
 Dimitrios Farantos (March 1, 2010 – Sept 17, 2010)
 Vasilis Vouzas (Sept 17, 2010 – March 16, 2011)
 Giannis Papakostas (March 16, 2011 – Aug 20, 2011)
 Georgios Paraschos (Aug 28, 2011 – March 22, 2013)
 Jasminko Velić (March 22, 2013 – April 25, 2013)
 Takis Lemonis (May 18, 2013 – Oct 14, 2013)
 Dimitrios Farantos (Oct 14, 2013 – Oct 21, 2013)
 Nikos Karageorgiou (Oct 21, 2013 – Feb 11, 2014)
 Savvas Pantelidis (Feb 12, 2014 – Feb 9, 2015)
 Akis Mantzios (Feb 9, 2015 – Jun 10, 2016)
 Ratko Dostanić (Jun 15, 2016 – Jan 5, 2017)
 Giannis Christopoulos (Jan 7, 2017 – Feb 21, 2017)
 Dimitrios Farantos (Mar 14, 2017 – Jun 30, 2017)
 José Anigo (Jun 30, 2017 – May 9, 2018)
 Akis Mantzios (Jun 7, 2018 – Oct 22, 2018)
  Giuseppe Sannino (Oct 22, 2018 – Jan 21, 2019)
 Nikos Karageorgiou (Jan 22, 2019 – May 11, 2019)
 Dimitrios Spanos (Jul 3, 2019 – Oct 28, 2019)
 Sotiris Antoniou (Oct 28, 2019 – Feb 24, 2021)
  Giuseppe Sannino (Feb 24, 2021 – May 11, 2021)
 Sokratis Ofrydopoulos (May 11, 2021 – Jun 30, 2021)
 Giannis Taousianis (Jul 1, 2021 – Sept 22, 2022)
 Jasminko Velić (Sept 22, 2022 – Present)

Personnel

Ownership and current board

|}

Coaching staff

References

External links
  
 Levadiakos at Super League 
 Levadiakos at UEFA

 
Boeotia
Football clubs in Central Greece
Association football clubs established in 1961
1961 establishments in Greece
Livadeia
Super League Greece 2 clubs